Acetylgalactosaminyl-O-glycosyl-glycoprotein beta-1,6-N-acetylglucosaminyltransferase ( with systematic name UDP-N-acetyl-D-glucosamine:N-acetyl-beta-D-glucosaminyl-(1->3)-N-acetyl-D-galactosaminyl-R 6-beta-N-acetyl-D-glucosaminyltransferase. This enzyme catalyses the following chemical reaction

 UDP-N-acetyl-D-glucosamine + N-acetyl-beta-D-glucosaminyl-(1->3)-N-acetyl-D-galactosaminyl-R  UDP + N-acetyl-beta-D-glucosaminyl-(1->6)-[N-acetyl-beta-D-glucosaminyl-(1->3)]-N-acetyl-D-galactosaminyl-R

Nomenclature 
Acetylgalactosaminyl-O-glycosyl-glycoprotein beta-1,6-N-acetylglucosaminyltransferase is also known as O-glycosyl-oligosaccharide-glycoprotein N-acetylglucosaminyltransferase IV, uridine diphosphoacetylglucosamine-mucin beta(1->6)-acetylglucosaminyltransferase B, core 4 beta6-GalNAc-transferase, core 6beta-GalNAc-transferase B, UDP-N-acetyl-D-glucosamine:O-oligosaccharide-glycoprotein (N-acetyl-D-glucosamine to N-acetyl-D-galactosamine of N-acetyl-beta-D-glucosaminyl-1,3-N-acetyl-D-galactosaminyl-R) beta-1,6-N-acetyl-D-glucosaminyltransferase).

See also 
 EC 2.4.1.102 (beta-1,3-galactosyl-O-glycosyl-glycoprotein beta-1,6-N-acetylglucosaminyltransferase)
 EC 2.4.1.146 (beta-1,3-galactosyl-O-glycosyl-glycoprotein beta-1,3-N-acetylglucosaminyltransferase)
 EC 2.4.1.147 (acetylgalactosaminyl-O-glycosyl-glycoprotein beta-1,3-N-acetylglucosaminyltransferase).

References

External links 
 

EC 2.4.1